Philogelos is the oldest existing collection of jokes. The collection is written in Ancient Greek, and the language used indicates that it may have been written in the fourth century AD, according to William Berg, an American classics professor. It is attributed to Hierocles and Philagrius, about whom little is known. Because the celebration of a thousand years of Rome is mentioned in joke 62, the collection perhaps dates from after that event in 248 AD. Although it is the oldest existing collection of jokes, it is known that it was not the oldest collection, because Athenaeus wrote that Philip II of Macedon paid for a social club in Athens to write down its members' jokes, and at the beginning of the second century BC, Plautus twice has a character mentioning books of jokes. The collection contains 265 jokes categorised into subjects such as teachers and scholars, and eggheads and fools.

Modern day
In 2008, British TV personality and comedian Jim Bowen tested the material on a modern audience. One of the jokes in Philogelos has been described as "an ancestor of Monty Python's famous Dead Parrot comedy sketch." Comedian Jimmy Carr has said that some of the jokes are "strikingly similar" to modern ones.

The National Museum of Language showcases a virtual exhibit, ‘‘Philogelos: The First Joke Book,” of cartoons created from translations of the Philogelos collection.

See also
Roman jokes
Poetics (Aristotle), Aristotle discusses the nature of tragedy and comedy, but the book on the latter is lost.

References

Further reading
The Philogelos or Laughter-Lover (London Studies in Classical Philology Series, 10) by Barry Baldwin 1983, 
Philogelos: Hieroclis et Philagrii facetiae by A. Eberhard (1869) Berlin: H. Ebeling & C. Plahn
Ἱεροκλέους και Φιλαγρίου (Hierokles kai Philagrios). G. Pachymeris declamationes XIII quarum XII ineditae, Hieroclis et Philagrii grammaticorum φιλόγελως longe maximam partem ineditus by Jean François Boissonade de Fontarabie (1848) Paris
Philogelos, Antike Witze, Greek and German by Kai Brodersen Wiesbaden: Marix 2016,

External links
Φιλόγελως, Bibliotheca Augustana, E-text (Greek)
45 Jokes from The Laughter Lover
Philogelos: The Laugh Addict translated by Professor William Berg
The World's Oldest Surviving Joke Book, with discussion of its authorship, context, style, and purpose

Ancient Greek works
Humour
4th-century books